Javier Fortuna Francisco (born July 15, 1989) is a Dominican professional boxer. He held the WBA interim featherweight title from 2012 to 2013, the WBA (Regular) super featherweight title from 2015 to 2016, and challenged for the IBF lightweight title in 2018.

Early life
Fortuna was raised in La Romana, Dominican Republic, where he trained in boxing with his older brother, Jonathon Alexander Fortuna.

Amateur career
Fortuna was a member of the Dominican National Team, and during his amateur career he won a Pan American silver medal and a gold medal at the Dominican National Championships. Fortuna ended his amateur record with a record of 196-16.

Professional career
Fortuna is promoted by Lou DiBella's company, DiBella Entertainment. In March 2011, Fortuna knocked out Florida prospect Derrick Wilson to win the WBC Youth Intercontinental Featherweight Championship. He later followed this up with a first-round knockout victory over prospect Yuandale Evans, and a second-round knockout over former IBF and IBO Featherweight Champion, Cristobal Cruz.

WBA interim featherweight title fight
On the undercard of Manny Pacquiao vs. Juan Manuel Marquez IV on December 8, 2012, Fortuna faced previously unbeaten Irish fighter Patrick Hyland for the WBA Interim Featherweight Title. Fortuna started fast, throwing power punches in bunches, but the Irishman stayed on his feet and began to put pressure on Fortuna. Fortuna seemed to fade late but had built enough of an early lead to earn a unanimous decision, and hand Hyland his first loss as a professional fighter.

WBA regular super featherweight title fight
On the undercard of Amir Khan vs. Chris Algieri on May 20, 2015, Fortuna faced the Costa Rican Bryan Vázquez for the WBA (Regular) Super Featherweight Title. Fortuna started strong, throwing a lot of punches and making Vasquez look slow. Fortuna kept his game plan until the last round and won his second world title as a professional.

In his first title defense, Fortuna faced Carlos Velasquez. Fortuna started strong, and managed to drop Velasquez in the second round. Fortuna continued to be in control for most of the fight and started punishing Velasquez badly, until the tenth round when the referee stepped in and waved off the fight.

On 20 January, 2018 Fortuna was scheduled to fight Robert Easter Jr for his IBF lightweight belt. However, Fortuna was not able to make weight and Easter Jr's IBF belt was not on the line. Easter Jr ended up victorious, via a debatable split-decision. Two judges scored the fight in favor of the champion, 115-112 and 114-113 and one in favor of Fortuna 114-113.

On 16 June, 2018 Fortuna battled Adrian Granados. In an accidental clash, Fortuna was pushed out of the ring and had to be carried out of the arena on a stretcher. The bout ended in a no-contest decision.

On 2 November, 2019 Fortuna Jesus Cuellar and dominated him to a second-round TKO victory.

Fortuna vs. Campbell cancellation
Fortuna was supposed to face Luke Campbell on April 17, 2020 for the vacant WBC lightweight title, but the fight was cancelled due to the coronavirus pandemic.

Fortuna vs. Linares cancellation
Fortuna was scheduled to face former world champion Jorge Linares on August 28, 2020, but the fight was cancelled after Linares tested positive for Covid-19.

Fortuna vs. Garcia 
On July 16, 2022 Fortuna fought Ryan Garcia at super lightweight in Crypto.Com Arena in Los Angeles, California. Garcia defeated Fortuna in 6 rounds via TKO.

Professional boxing record

References

External links

Javier Fortuna - Profile, News Archive & Current Rankings at Box.Live

|-

Stripped

|-

Southpaw boxers
World featherweight boxing champions
World Boxing Association champions
1989 births
Living people
Dominican Republic male boxers
Featherweight boxers
Super-featherweight boxers
Lightweight boxers